Carmina Useros Cortés (24 February 1928 – 23 March 2017) was a Spanish writer, ceramist, painter, and cultural manager. A researcher of the gastronomic, artisan, and cultural traditions of Albacete, she was one of the first women gastronomes in Spain.

Biography
Carmina Useros earned a licentiate in teaching at the Normal School of Albacete. She studied Philosophy and Literature at the Complutense University of Madrid. In the 1950s she taught women to read and write. In the 1970s, she was the only woman to sign a letter of support for the anti-Francoist .

She married the ophthalmologist Manuel Belmonte González, and in 1968 they began touring the Province of Albacete, researching and recovering its cultural heritage. She drew on these experiences to write publications such as the 1971 cookbook Mil recetas de Albacete y su provincia (A Thousand Recipes of Albacete and its Province) and 1973's En busca de la Artesanía de Albacete (In Search of the Crafts of Albacete). The couple later expanded their travels throughout the Iberian Peninsula and the Bealearic and Canary archipelagos. In 1970 they restored the Agujero de Chinchilla Caves, making them an art gallery.

Useros developed an intense focus on the dissemination and reading of Don Quixote, organizing the "Ruta del Quijote" in 1971. In 1995 she began a cycle of readings of Quixote held every first Sunday of the month in La Mancha's village of Casa del Olivar, offering a Quixotic food to those who attended.

Useros and Belmonte had five children – Manuel, Pilar, José Pablo, the politician , and the soprano .

Carmina Useros died in Albacete on 23 March 2017 after a long illness.

Publications
 Cocina de Albacete. Mil recetas de Albacete y su provincia (1971, 1992, 2001), 
 En busca de la Artesanía de Albacete (1973), 
 La Guía de la Gastronomía de La Mancha (1975), with Manuel Belmonte González
 Fiestas populares de Albacete y su provincia (1980), 
 Guía de la Artesanía de Albacete (1986), with Carlos Villasante Pareja,

Awards and distinctions
In 2002, Carmina Useros received the Albacetian of the Year award from the President of Castilla–La Mancha, José Bono.

The novelist and gastronome Manuel Vázquez Montalbán mentions her in his novel La Rosa de Alejandría as "the excellent Carmina Useros".

References

External links

1928 births
2017 deaths
20th-century Spanish historians
20th-century Spanish painters
20th-century Spanish women writers
Painters from Castile and León
Writers from Castile and León
Complutense University of Madrid alumni
Spanish ethnographers
Spanish potters
Spanish women historians
Spanish women painters
Women potters